The Healdsburg Enterprise was a newspaper that covered the community of Healdsburg, California from 1876 to 1929.

See also
Healdsburg Tribune

References 

 "Nothing but News: A History of Healdsburg's Newspapers from 1860-1950," Marie Djordjevich, Russian River Recorder (Healdsburg Museum and Historical Society), Spring 2001, Issue 72.

External links
California Digital Newspaper Collection

Newspapers published in the San Francisco Bay Area
1888 establishments in California
Healdsburg, California
Mass media in Sonoma County, California